Aaron Spelling (April 22, 1923 June 23, 2006) was an American film and television producer and occasional actor. His productions included the TV series Family (1976–1980), Charlie's Angels (1976–1981), The Love Boat (1977–1986), Hart to Hart (1979–1984), Dynasty (1981–1989), Beverly Hills, 90210 (1990–2000), Melrose Place (1992–1999), 7th Heaven (1996–2007), and Charmed (1998–2006). He also served as producer of The Mod Squad (1968–1973), The Rookies (1972–1976), and Sunset Beach (1997–1999).

Through his production company Spelling Television, Spelling holds the record as the most prolific television producer in US television history, with 218 producer and executive producer credits. Forbes ranked him the 11th top-earning deceased celebrity in 2009.

Early life
Spelling was born in Dallas, Texas. He was the son of Pearl (née Wald) and David Spelling, Russian Jewish immigrants. His father worked as a tailor and changed his surname from Spurling to Spelling after emigrating to the United States. Spelling was the youngest of five children. He had three older brothers: Maxwell “Max” Seltzer (circa 1909–?), Sam Spelling (1916–2001) and Daniel Spelling (1921–2009) and an older half-sister, Becky Seltzer Giller (1910–1978). 

At the age of eight, Spelling psychosomatically lost the use of his legs due to trauma caused by constant anti-semitic bullying from his schoolmates, and was confined to bed for a year. He made a full recovery.

After attending Forest Avenue High School in Dallas, he served in the United States Army Air Corps as a pilot during World War II.

Spelling later graduated from Southern Methodist University in 1949, where he was a cheerleader.

Career

Spelling made his first appearance as an actor in a film as Harry Williams in Vicki, directed by Harry Horner, in 1953. That same year, he appeared in the TV series I Led Three Lives and Dragnet (six episodes, 1953–55). Spelling appeared in episode 112 of I Love Lucy ("Tennessee Bound," season 4, 1955) and Alfred Hitchcock Presents ("Breakdown", 1955)., as Weed Pindle in Gunsmokes season one, episode 35, "The Guitar" (1956); He continued to appear in films and TV (often uncredited) over 25 times by 1957, appearing briefly as an actor in 1963, 1995, and 1998 (all uncredited.)

Spelling sold his first script to Jane Wyman Presents in 1954. He guest-starred that same year as a dogcatcher in the premiere episode of the CBS situation comedy, Willy, starring June Havoc as a young lawyer in New Hampshire, who later relocates to New York City to represent a vaudeville troupe.

Two years later, Spelling gained experience as a producer and additional credits as a script writer working for Four Star Television on the series Zane Grey Theater, which aired between 1956 and 1961. Of the 149 episodes in that series, he wrote 20 of the teleplays and produced many others. Spelling produced Burke's Law while at Four Star.  The show was the first success for Spelling and pioneered the multiple guest star format, later seen on The Love Boat and Fantasy Island. 

Thomas-Spelling Productions was a television production company formed by comedian Danny Thomas and producer Aaron Spelling on April 15, 1966, as a partnership with 24 properties. Thomas continued his existing partnership, T&L Productions, with Sheldon Leonard. The company adapted its name by July 18, 1966, when it announced the financial involvement of ABC with its first show, Range (later Rango), a half-hour comedy western starring Tim Conway and its rented space on Desilu Productions' Gower lot. ABC also picked up another show for a pilot, just in an outline treatment, in The Guns of Will Sonnett.  Thomas-Spelling Productions' active operations ended with the last season of The Mod Squad in 1972.  Spelling formed a new partnership with Leonard Goldberg, Spelling-Goldberg Productions.

Beginning in 1965, Spelling began producing successful television shows including The Mod Squad, The Rookies, Family, Charlie's Angels, Fantasy Island, The Love Boat, Dynasty, Beverly Hills, 90210 (which starred his daughter Tori), Melrose Place, 7th Heaven, Charmed, Jane's House and Sunset Beach. Spelling founded Spelling Entertainment in 1965, alongside partnerships with comedian/actor Danny Thomas (Thomas-Spelling Productions, 1966–1972), and television/film producer Leonard Goldberg (Spelling-Goldberg Productions, 1972–1986) He produced the unsuccessful situation comedy The San Pedro Beach Bums in 1977.

In 2004, Spelling was portrayed in two television movies: Dan Castellaneta portrayed Spelling in Behind the Camera: The Unauthorized Story of Charlie's Angels, and Nicholas Hammond portrayed Spelling in television movie Dynasty: The Making of a Guilty Pleasure.

Personal life
Spelling married actress Carolyn Jones in 1953, in California when he was 30 and she was 23. They divorced in 1964. He briefly dated actress Jill Haworth when he was 42 and she was 19. Spelling married Candy Gene (née Marer) in 1968 when he was 45 and she was 23. The couple had daughter Tori in 1973 and son Randy in 1978.

In 1988, Spelling bought the  property of Bing Crosby's former Los Angeles house. He demolished the property and built a 123-room home on the lot in 1991. Known as "The Manor", it has  of floor space and as of 2006 was the largest single-family home in Los Angeles. Spelling's widow Candy listed the home for sale in 2008 for $150 million. Heiress Petra Ecclestone ultimately purchased the property for $85 million in 2011 through a brokered agreement that was developed by Brandon Davis, the brother of Jason Davis and grandson of wealthy industrialist, Marvin Davis.

In 1992, Candy, Spelling's second wife, commissioned pinball manufacturer Data East to produce a personalized table as a gift to Spelling. The game, a modified version of Data East's Lethal Weapon 3 table, has since appeared publicly at collector's expos.

Legacy and death
On September 15, 1978, Spelling was honored with a star on the Hollywood Walk of Fame located at 6667 Hollywood Blvd. In 1996, he was inducted into the Television Hall of Fame.

In 1983, he was accorded the NAACP Humanitarian Award for his monetary donation that permitted a 21-year-old's heart transplant operation.

In 2001, Spelling was diagnosed with oral cancer.

On June 23, 2006, Spelling died at The Manor, his estate in Holmby Hills, Los Angeles, from complications of a stroke he suffered five days prior. He also suffered from Alzheimer's disease. A private funeral was held several days later, and Spelling was entombed in a mausoleum in Culver City's Hillside Memorial Park Cemetery.

On August 27, 2006, Spelling was posthumously honored at the 58th Annual Primetime Emmy Awards by former employees Joan Collins, Stephen Collins, Heather Locklear, Farrah Fawcett, Kate Jackson and Jaclyn Smith.

7th Heavens May 13, 2007, episode, the last before the series finale, was dedicated to Spelling. When 7th Heaven ended its run, it was touted by the network as being Spelling's longest-running series and the longest-running "family drama" in American television history.

Filmography
Spelling was a producer in all films unless otherwise noted.

Film

As writer

As an actor

Television

As writer

As an actor

Miscellaneous crew

Soundtrack

As director

Thanks

Awards and nominations

See also

Norman Lear
David L. Wolper
Alan Landsburg

References

External links

 
 
 

1923 births
2006 deaths
American Cinema Editors
United States Army Air Forces pilots of World War II
American people of Polish-Jewish descent
American people of Russian-Jewish descent
Television producers from California
People with Alzheimer's disease
Burials at Hillside Memorial Park Cemetery
Male actors from Dallas
Southern Methodist University alumni
Spelling family
Television producers from Texas
People from Holmby Hills, Los Angeles
Paramount Global people
Primetime Emmy Award winners